Mytholmroyd railway station serves the communities of Mytholmroyd, Luddendenfoot, Midgley, Cragg Vale, and surrounding areas in West Yorkshire, England. It has disabled access via ramps instead of steps on both platforms, unusually as the station is built on a viaduct.

History

The Manchester and Leeds Railway (M&LR) was opened in stages.

The station was opened by the M&LR in May 1847; within a few weeks of this, the company became the Lancashire and Yorkshire Railway.

Facilities
The entrance to the station is by way of two long step-free paths from each side of the Mytholmroyd Viaduct. The original station building (as seen above) included a ticket office, as the main entrance to both platforms. The station building was later closed and tickets had to be purchased on the train but later sheltered ticket machines were installed on platform 2, payable by card. Northern's online 'click and collect' system Application, allows the user to purchase tickets, which are then collected on Platform 2. In October 2004, the first arch of the viaduct on the access ramp was cleaned, the path was extended and new fencing was installed.  Two live information screens have been added showing the trains service, type and stops / calls. In 2013, a bicycle area was added at the top of one of the ramps, covered by CCTV.

In August 2016, planning permission was granted to return the station into commercial use. The planning permission allowed for the floors to be ripped out and reinstated, fireplaces to be refurbished and floors / windows to be installed. The station partnership is currently looking for the community to develop a business plan to use the building for community use. Ideas raised include a 'Ted Hughes' museum, bar and cafe.
There is an active station user group - Mytholmroyd Station Partnership, which has enhanced the station area with gardens, flower tubs and school art - including the Northern Mosaic by students from Calder High School. A car park, at the top of platform 2 access road, which engineers use to get machinery onto the tracks in the area, will be completed as of Winter 2020 with near 200 spaces including e-car charging facilities as well as car club spaces and secure cycle lockers.

Services

The station has seen its daytime service cut significantly at the winter 2019 timetable change, as the York to Blackpool service no longer calls here on weekdays.

See also
Listed buildings in Hebden Royd

References

External links

Railway stations in Calderdale
DfT Category F1 stations
Former Lancashire and Yorkshire Railway stations
Railway stations in Great Britain opened in 1847
Northern franchise railway stations
1847 establishments in England
railway station